Timeline of anthropology, 1910–1919

Events
1911
Ishi is 'discovered' and taken to the Museum of Anthropology at the University of California, San Francisco
1915
Bronislaw Malinowski began his studies in the Trobriand Islands

Publications

Births
1911
Weston La Barre
Louis Dumont
Johannes Falkenberg
Max Gluckman

1914
Thor Heyerdahl
Oscar Lewis
Marvin Opler

1915
John W. Bennett
Robert Heizer
Elman Service

1916
Edward Dozier
Michel Foucault
Derek Freeman
M N Srinivas
1918
John Arundel Barnes
Ray Birdwhistell
James Clyde Mitchell
David Schneider

Deaths

1914
Adolph Bandelier
Alexander Francis Chamberlain
1915
Frederic Ward Putnam
1916
Ishi
1918
Herman Karl Haberlin

Anthropology by decade
Anthropology
Anthropology timelines
1910s decade overviews